Corvitalusoides grandiculus is an extinct species of songbird, in a monotypic genus of uncertain familial affinities, from the Late Oligocene or Early Miocene of northern Australia. It was described from a distal tibiotarsal fragment found at Riversleigh, in the Boodjamulla National Park of north-western Queensland. The bone size indicates that the bird was among the largest of songbirds, within the size range of ravens and lyrebirds.

References

Fossil taxa described in 2006
Extinct monotypic bird genera
Songbirds
Oligocene birds
Miocene birds
Oligocene birds of Australia
Riversleigh fauna
Miocene birds of Australia
Prehistoric bird genera